Parliamentary elections were held in Vietnam on 20 July 1997. The Vietnamese Fatherland Front was the only party to contest the election, although independent candidates were also allowed to run. The VFF won 447 of the 450 seats, with voter turnout was reported to be 99.6%.

Results

References

Vietnam
Elections in Vietnam
1997 in Vietnam
One-party elections
Election and referendum articles with incomplete results